Sony Music Nashville is the country music branch of the Sony Music Group.  
  
Based in Nashville, Tennessee, Sony Music Nashville includes its three country recording labels Arista Nashville, Columbia Nashville, and RCA Nashville, as well as Christian music company Provident Label Group.

History
Since 2015, Sony Music Nashville has been overseen by CEO Randy Goodman.

In January 2011, Sony Music Nashville announced an exclusive worldwide distribution deal with Skyville Records, a new Nashville label headed up by music producer Paul Worley.

In August 2011, Sony Music Nashville announced a restructuring that realigned several artists among its labels and merged the promotion teams for BNA Records and Columbia Nashville, while retaining the respective label identities for both BNA and Columbia artists and releases.

In February 2012, Sony Music Nashville entered into an exclusive distribution deal with new Nashville-based label, Streamsound Records, launched by producer Byron Gallimore and industry veteran Jim Wilkes.

On June 4, 2012, it was announced that BNA Records would be retired and its roster moved to Columbia Nashville, leaving Sony Music Nashville with three country labels.

In September 2012, Overton and rpmentertainment president Scott Siman announced an exclusive worldwide distribution and license agreement to distribute rpme singles and albums.

Notable artists on Arista Nashville

Adam Doleac
Ryan Hurd 
Old Dominion
Seaforth
Nate Smith
Morgan Wade

Formerly on Arista Nashville

Brent Anderson
Carlton Anderson
Keith Anderson
Asleep at the Wheel
Sherrié Austin
Adam Brand
Blackhawk
BR549
Brooks & Dunn
Kix Brooks
Shannon Brown
Cam
Deana Carter
Jason Michael Carroll
Jim Collins
Kristy Lee Cook
Rob Crosby
Clint Daniels
Linda Davis
Diamond Rio
The Doobie Brothers
Ronnie Dunn
Seth Ennis
Exile
Radney Foster 
The Henningsens
Rebecca Lynn Howard
Alan Jackson
Brett James
Carolyn Dawn Johnson
Jypsi
Kristen Kelly
LANco
Tim McGraw & Faith Hill
Logan Mize
Dude Mowrey
Jerrod Niemann
Lee Roy Parnell 
Brad Paisley
The Sisterhood
Matt Stell
The Swon Brothers
Pam Tillis
The Tractors
Ryan Tyler
Carrie Underwood
Phil Vassar
Steve Wariner
Calvin Wiggett
Michelle Wright

Formerly on Career Records

Tammy Graham 
Brett James
Lee Roy Parnell

Formerly on Arista Austin

Jeff Black
Radney Foster
Robert Earl Keen
Abra Moore
Sister 7
Townes Van Zandt

Notable artists on Columbia Nashville
Luke Combs (Columbia/River House)
Elle King
Kameron Marlowe
Maren Morris
Jameson Rodgers (Columbia/River House)
Mitchell Tenpenny (Columbia/Riser House)
Tenille Townes

Formerly on Columbia Nashville

Jessi Alexander
John Anderson
Keith Anderson
Lynn Anderson
Blackhawk
Larry Boone
Wade Bowen
Harold Bradley
Caitlin & Will
Calamity Jane
Stacy Dean Campbell
Mary Chapin Carpenter
Johnny Cash
June Carter Cash
Rosanne Cash
Kenny Chesney
Mark Chesnutt
David Allan Coe
Rodney Crowell
Jimmy Dean
Cole Deggs & the Lonesome
Dixie Chicks (Columbia/Open Wide)
Deryl Dodd
Johnny Duncan
Emilio Navaira
Barbara Fairchild
Shelly Fairchild
Fairground Saints (Sony Nashville)
Tyler Farr
Lester Flatt
Béla Fleck
Lefty Frizzell
Ben Gallaher (Sony Nashville)
Hank Garland
Bradley Gaskin
Mark Gray
Great Plains
Wade Hayes
Jack Ingram
The Highwaymen
Casey James
Christian Kane
Miranda Lambert
Levon
Brice Long
Bobby Lord
Tim McGraw
Barbara Mandrell
Matthews, Wright & King
Tim Mensy
Ashley Monroe
Montgomery Gentry
Nikki Nelson
Willie Nelson
The O'Kanes
Old Crow Medicine Show
Steven Lee Olsen
Dolly Parton
Carl Perkins
Kellie Pickler
Pistol Annies
Ray Price
Mike Reid
Ricochet
Marty Robbins
David Rogers
John Wesley Ryles
Earl Scruggs
Shenandoah
Ricky Van Shelton
Jessica Simpson
Carl Smith
Connie Smith
Joanna Smith
Doug Stone
Larry Stewart
Marty Stuart
Rick Trevino
Josh Thompson
Travis Tritt
Tanya Tucker
Leah Turner
Billy Walker
Charlie Walker
Van Zant
Ron Wallace
Joy Lynn White
Trent Willmon
Gretchen Wilson

Formerly on Epic Nashville

 Stephanie Bentley
 James Bonamy
 Tommy Cash
 Charlie Daniels Band
 Tammy Cochran
 Brad Cotter
 Bobbie Cryner
 Clint Daniels
 Linda Davis
 Darryl & Don Ellis
 Joe Diffie
 Dixiana
 Jace Everett
 Exile
 Gibson/Miller Band
 Billy Gilman
 The Goldens
 Merle Haggard
 Susan Haynes
 Ty Herndon
 David Houston
 Waylon Jennings
 Jim & Jesse
 George Jones
 The Kinleys
 Miranda Lambert
 Patty Loveless
 Brad Martin
 Ken Mellons
 Keith Palmer
 Johnny Paycheck
 Colt Prather
 Jon Randall
 Collin Raye
 Charlie Rich
 Charlie Robison
 Tim Ryan
 The Shooters
 Ricky Skaggs
 Russell Smith
 Sons of the Desert
 Joe Stampley
 Keith Stegall
 Les Taylor
 Gene Watson
 Wild Horses
 Joy Lynn White
 Gretchen Wilson
 Tammy Wynette

Formerly on Monument Nashville

 Billy Ray Cyrus
 Joe Diffie
 Dixie Chicks
 Gil Grand
 Yankee Grey
 Wade Hayes
 Cledus T. Judd
 Danni Leigh
 Little Big Town
 Michael Peterson

Formerly on Lucky Dog Nashville

 BR549
 The Derailers
 Deryl Dodd
 Jack Ingram
 Bruce Robison
 Charlie Robison
 Pam Tillis

Artists on RCA Nashville

Kane Brown
Andrew Jannakos
Corey Kent
Pistol Annies
Restless Road
Rachel Wammack
Chris Young

Formerly on RCA Nashville

Alabama
Deborah Allen
Eddy Arnold
Chet Atkins
Baillie & the Boys
Bobby Bare
Jeff Bates
Matraca Berg
Clint Black
Catherine Britt
Garth Brooks
Jim Ed Brown
Tracy Byrd
Helen Cornelius
Paul Craft
Gail Davies
Skeeter Davis
John Denver
Dean Dillon
Ty England
Sara Evans
Leon Everette
Family Brown
Ray Price  (RCA/Dimension)
Foster & Lloyd
Keith Gattis
Vince Gill 
Danny Gokey
Andy Griggs
Gus Hardin
Mike Henderson
Becky Hobbs
Ryan Hurd (Moved to Arista Nashville)
Waylon Jennings
George Jones
The Judds 
Kristen Kelly
Miranda Lambert
Niko Moon (RCA/River House)
Aaron Lines
Eddie London
Brice Long
Love and Theft
Lauren Lucas
Louise Mandrell
Jim Lauderdale
Martina McBride
Coley McCabe
Pake McEntire
Ronnie Milsap
Lorrie Morgan
Juice Newton
The Oak Ridge Boys
Jamie O'Hara
Old Dominion(Moved to Arista Nashville)
Robert Ellis Orrall
Jake Owen
Dolly Parton
Pistol Annies
The Osborn Sisters
K.T. Oslin 
Paul Overstreet
Dolly Parton
John Pierce
Bobby Pinson 
Prairie Oyster
Charley Pride
Eddie Rabbitt
Eddy Raven
Jerry Reed
Jim Reeves
Restless Heart
Kenny Rogers 
Seaforth (Moved to Arista Nashville)
Crystal Shawanda
Shenandoah
Connie Smith
Joanna Smith
Hank Snow
Jo-El Sonnier
Tate Stevens
Jimmy Buffett (RCA/Mailboat)
Tommy Shane Steiner
Larry Stewart
Sylvia
Nat Stuckey
3 of Hearts
Josh Thompson
The Thompson Brothers Band
Mel Tillis
Aaron Tippin
Steve Vaus
Porter Wagoner
Clay Walker
Steve Wariner
Dottie West
Lari White
Keith Whitley
Chuck Wicks
Wild Choir
Don Williams
Trisha Yearwood

Formerly on BNA Records

Rhett Akins
John Anderson
Marc Beeson
Wade Bowen
Shannon Brown
Tracy Byrd
Kenny Chesney
Terri Clark
Kellie Coffey
Dale Daniel
Jennifer Day
Bill Engvall
Tyler Farr
Pat Green
Merle Haggard
Kim Hill
Jesse Hunter
Casey James
Keith Whitley
Chris Janson
Sarah Johns
Jamey Johnson
George Jones (Bandit/BNA)
The Kentucky Headhunters
Blaine Larsen (Giantslayer/BNA)
Jim Lauderdale
Aaron Lines
Lonestar
The Lost Trailers
The Lunabelles
Mindy McCready
Craig Morgan
Lorrie Morgan
K. T. Oslin
Kellie Pickler
Pinmonkey
Rachel Proctor
The Remingtons
John Rich
Tim Ryan
Jason Sellers
Lisa Stewart
Doug Supernaw
Tebey
Turner Nichols
Ray Vega
The Warren Brothers
B. B. Watson
The Wilkinsons

Unassigned Artists on Sony Music Nashville
Tyler Booth
Brooks & Dunn
Georgia Webster

See also
Arista Nashville
BNA Records
Columbia Records
RCA Records

References

External links
 Official website
 Sony Nashville A&R team contact list

Record labels based in Nashville, Tennessee
Sony Music
American country music record labels
Record labels established in 1989
Record labels based in Tennessee